Colin Joseph Cloherty (born September 16, 1987) is a former American football tight end. He was signed by the Indianapolis Colts as an undrafted free agent in 2009. He played college football at Brown.

Cloherty has also been a member of the Cleveland Browns, San Francisco 49ers, Jacksonville Jaguars, and Atlanta Falcons.

Professional career

Indianapolis Colts
Cloherty was signed as an undrafted free agent by the Indianapolis Colts on April 30, 2009. He was waived on August 31.  He played in the final game of the season, catching 1 pass for 2 yards.

Cleveland Browns
On October 21, 2009, Cloherty was signed to the practice squad of the Cleveland Browns. He was released on November 9.

Second stint with Colts
Cloherty was signed to the Colts active roster on January 2, 2010. He was released on September 4.

San Francisco 49ers
On October 6, 2010, Cloherty was signed to the practice squad of the San Francisco 49ers. He was signed to the active roster on December 18, and appeared in the final two games of the season. The team waived him on August 23, 2011.

Jacksonville Jaguars
On December 11, 2011, Cloherty scored his first NFL touchdown by recovering a muffed punt against the Tampa Bay Buccaneers. He also had 4 receptions for 57 yards during the season. Cloherty spent the 2012 preseason with the team before being released on August 31.

He was re-signed on September 4 after an injury to reserve tight end Brett Brackett.

He was released by the Jaguars on September 10, 2012.

Atlanta Falcons
Cloherty signed with the Atlanta Falcons on June 18, 2013. He was waived by the Falcons on August 25, 2013.

External links
 Brown Bears bio
 San Francisco 49ers bio

References

1987 births
Living people
People from Bethesda, Maryland
Players of American football from Maryland
Gonzaga College High School alumni
American football tight ends
Brown Bears football players
Indianapolis Colts players
Cleveland Browns players
San Francisco 49ers players
Jacksonville Jaguars players
Atlanta Falcons players